"Makes Me Happy" is a song by American musician and actor, Drake Bell. It was released as the second single from his second studio album, It's Only Time, on October 16, 2007. "Makes Me Happy" was originally used as score music for the Nickelodeon show Zoey 101 and some of it was sung by Backhouse Mike in the Zoey 101 episode "Quinn's Alpaca". The song was used in the Drake & Josh episode "Really Big Shrimp", however the version heard in it is a different version than the version on It's Only Time. In 2014, a rearranged more upbeat, rockabilly-inspired version of the song appears on Bell's third studio album, Ready Steady Go!. "Makes Me Happy" peaked at number 103 on the Billboard Hot 100.

Track listing
U.S. promo digital download single

Personnel
Drake Bell – lead vocals, backing vocals, guitars
C. J. Abraham – horns
Brian Burwell – drums
Michael Corcoran – bass guitar, lead and rhythm guitar, keyboards, percussion, backing vocals
Rob Jacobs – mixing

Chart performance
The song managed to make the Billboard Bubbling Under Hot 100 Singles chart in August 2007, by debuting at No. 3 (#103 on the Billboard Hot 100). As a result, the song became Bell's first charting song on any Billboard chart in his career. The song also made a brief appearance on the Billboard Pop 100 chart, peaking at number 67.

Weekly charts

References

2007 singles
Drake Bell songs
Drake & Josh
Songs written by Drake Bell
Universal Motown Records singles
Universal Music Group singles